Tienoxolol is a beta adrenergic receptor antagonist.

References

Beta blockers
Thiophenes
Ethyl esters